Alligator River is a small river in eastern North Carolina, separating Dare County and Tyrrell County.  It empties into Albemarle Sound. A 21-mile canal connects the Alligator River with Pungo River to its west. The Lindsey C. Warren Bridge of U.S. Route 64 crosses the river.

Alligator River is protected as part of Alligator River National Wildlife Refuge.  Habitat bordering the Refuge includes many diverse types including high and low pocosin, bogs, fresh and brackish water marshes, hardwood swamps, and Atlantic white cypress swamps. Plant species include pitcher plants and sun dews, low bush cranberries, redbay, Atlantic white cypress, pond pine, American sweetgum, red maple, and a wide variety of herbaceous and shrub species common to the East Coast. 
  
The refuge is one of the premier strongholds for American black bear on the Eastern Seaboard. 
It also has concentrations of ducks, geese, and swans. The wildlife diversity includes wading birds, shorebirds, American woodcock, raptors, black bears, alligators, white-tailed deer, raccoons, cottontail rabbits, bobwhite quail, northern river otters, red wolves, red-cockaded woodpeckers, and neotropical migrants.

References

External links
 
 http://www.fws.gov/alligatorriver/

Rivers of North Carolina
Rivers of Dare County, North Carolina
Rivers of Tyrrell County, North Carolina
Tributaries of Albemarle Sound